Lupi may refer to:

People 
 Alessandro Lupi (born 1970), Italian former professional footballer manager and former player
 Carlos Lupi (born 1957), Brazilian professor and politician
 Daniel Lupi (born 1961), American film producer
 Darrin Zammit Lupi (born 1968), Maltese photographer and journalist
 Didier Lupi Second (c.1520-after 1559), French composer
 Dov Lupi (born 1948), Israeli-American gymnast
 Francisco Lupi (1920–1954), Portuguese chess master
 Giorgia Lupi (born 1981), Italian information designer
 Giovanni Lupi, commonly known as Nino, (1908–1990), Swiss footballer
 Giuseppe Lupi (1894, date of death unknown), Italian gymnast
 Leonardo Lupi' (born 1972), Venezuelan footballer
 Ignazio Lupi (1867–1942), Italian actor and film director
 Johannes Lupi (c. 1506–1539), Franco-Flemish composer
 Maurizio Lupi (born 1959), Italian politician
 Miguel Ângelo Lupi (1826–1883), Portuguese painter and art professor
 Roberto Lupi (1908–1971), Italian composer, conductor, and music theorist
 Roldano Lupi (1909–1989), Italian film actor
 Tomás Verón Lupi (born 2000), Argentine professional footballer
 Walter Lupi (born 1960), Italian guitarist

Astronomy
Any of several stars in the constellation Lupus

Other 
 Lupi, Camarines Sur
 Lupeol synthase, an enzyme
 A.S. Roma, a football club known as i Lupi (Italian for "the Wolves")
 A.S. Avellino 1912, a football club known as i Lupi
 Piacenza Calcio, a football club, known as i Lupi

Italian-language surnames